Lushi may refer to:

 Lushi County (卢氏县), Henan, China
 Lushi, Tianmen (卢市镇), town in Tianmen, Hubei, China
 Lushi (book) (路史), a Song dynasty book of history and mythology

Lüshi may refer to:
 Lüshi (poetry) (律詩) an eight-line regulated verse style form of Classical Chinese poetry

See also
 Lüshi Chunqiu, an encyclopedic Chinese classic text 
 Lusi (disambiguation)